The Diocese of Kitale is an Anglican See in the Anglican Church of Kenya. As of August 2018, the current bishop is Emmanuel Chemengich.

Notes

Dioceses of the Anglican Church of Kenya
 
Trans-Nzoia County
Anglican dioceses of Nakuru